The Soulful Piano of Junior Mance is an album by jazz pianist Junior Mance which was recorded in 1960 and released on the Jazzland label.

Reception

The AllMusic site awarded the album three stars.

Track listing
All compositions by Junior Mance except where noted.
 "The Uptown"4:02  
 "Ralph's New Blues" (Milt Jackson)4:20  
 "Main Stem" (Duke Ellington)4:21  
 "Darling, Je Vous Aime Beaucoup" (Anna Sosenko)3:38  
 "Playhouse"4:14  
 "Sweet and Lovely" (Gus Arnheim, Jules LeMare, Harry Tobias)3:55  
 "In the Land of Oo-Bla-Dee" (Milt Orent, Mary Lou Williams)4:36 
 "I Don't Care" (Ray Bryant)4:27  
 "Swingmatism" (Jay McShann, William Scott)5:12

Personnel
Junior Mancepiano
Ben Tuckerbass
Bobby Thomasdrums

References

1960 albums
Junior Mance albums
Jazzland Records (1960) albums
Albums produced by Orrin Keepnews